Teoriia Gvaltu (translation: Ruckus Theory) – a Ukrainian music band that plays in the genres of street punk, ska and folk punk.

Biography
Formed in 2007, the band originally, in all respects, consisted of Les` (vocals, flute, trombone), Sashko (guitar, vocals) and Ivan (bass). Laptop samples had performed feature of drummer. By the time the guys listened to a variety of music and tried to play all heard in these compositions. The group combines folk, old-school-hardcore, ska and nu-metal.

Dmytro (drums) and Nadia (accordion) joined the group in 2007. After charismatic accordionista went to Odessa study medicine, Roman joined the band (keyboards, accordion, backing vocals). The band sent toward the style of ska, ska punk and reggae. When Ivan left the group, another Roman went to replace the bass. In 2011, Pancrate, the former leader of the Russian group "Keine Engel" (c. Perm), began to perform role of the bassist.

At the moment diverse musical style of the group can be described as punk rock (street punk, oi!) interspersed Ukrainian-Irish folk and ska punk.

Current members 
 Oleksii Kalashnyk — vocal, trombone, sopilka, keyboard (2007–present)
 Sashko Baranov — vocal, guitar (2007–present)
 Pankrat Cios — bass, backing vocals (2011–present)
 Vadym Kanchalaba — drums (2009–present)

Discography
 Three Arrows EP (2011)
 Karmaliuk (2016)

References

External links
Ruckus Theory on bandcamp.com
Teoriia Gvaltu on myspace.com
Teoriia Gvaltu on vk.com
Discography of Teoriia Gvaltu

Musical groups established in 2007
2007 establishments in Ukraine
Musicians from Khmelnytskyi, Ukraine
Ukrainian rock music groups
Ukrainian punk rock groups